Prathyangira Devi Temple is a Hindu temple located at Ayyavadi in the Thanjavur district of Tamil Nadu, India. The temple is dedicated to the powerful goddess Pratyangira, the incarnation of Goddess adishakti and the consort of Lord sharabha.narsimhi is feminine power of narsimha.maa pratyangira and narsimhi looks same but different.   

In this temple, there are idols of Goddess Lakshmi and Goddess Saraswathi placed nearby the idol of Goddess Pratyangira. Goddess Lakshmi is standing in her Pratyangira form and also in her normal form.

Significance 
The temple is more than 1000 years old and is associated with legends of the Mahabharata. The idol of Prathyangira Devi is flanked by those of Lakshmi and Saraswati.

References 

 
 http://www.hindupedia.com/en/Ayyavadi_Sri_Maha_Prathyangira_Devi
 http://kumbakonamtemples.in/ayyavadi-sri-maha-prathyangira-devi.html
 http://www.hindu-blog.com/2013/07/prathyangira-devi-temple-near.html
 https://web.archive.org/web/20141219104159/http://www.saibharathi.com/pratyangira.html

Hindu temples in Thanjavur district